Drassodex is a genus of ground spiders that was first described by J. Murphy in 2007.

Species
 it contains ten species:
Drassodex cervinus (Simon, 1914) – Spain, France
Drassodex drescoi Hervé, Roberts & Murphy, 2009 – France, Switzerland, Italy
Drassodex fritillifer (Simon, 1914) – Spain, France
Drassodex granja Hervé, Roberts & Murphy, 2009 – Spain
Drassodex heeri (Pavesi, 1873) – Europe
Drassodex hispanus (L. Koch, 1866) – Europe
Drassodex hypocrita (Simon, 1878) (type) – Europe
Drassodex lesserti (Schenkel, 1936) – France, Switzerland
Drassodex simoni Hervé, Roberts & Murphy, 2009 – France, Switzerland
Drassodex validior (Simon, 1914) – France

References

Araneomorphae genera
Gnaphosidae
Spiders of Asia